Jesse Addison Udall (June 24, 1893 – April 18, 1980) was an American jurist and member of the Udall political family who served as chief justice of the Arizona Supreme Court.

Udall was born and raised in Arizona, he was the son of David King Udall and Ida Frances (Hunt) Udall and was named after Jesse Nathaniel Smith and Addison Pratt, his great-grandfather. He was a member of the Church of Jesus Christ of Latter-day Saints. He served in the Arizona National Guard and was a veteran of both World War I and World War II and graduated from the University of Arizona Law School in 1924.

From 1931 to 1938, he was a member of the Arizona House of Representatives. He later served as a judge of the Arizona Superior Court from Graham County. From 1960 to 1972 he served as a justice of the Arizona Supreme Court, succeeding his brother Levi Stewart Udall in that position. In 1964 and 1969, he was chief justice. He died in Phoenix in 1980.

Legacy 

His grandson, Gordon H. Smith was a U.S. Senator from Oregon. His grandson Jesse Udall is the husband of Michelle Udall.

External links

 Jesse Addison Udall collection at the University of Arizona
 Biography at the Political Graveyard

1893 births
1980 deaths
20th-century American judges
American Latter Day Saints
American military personnel of World War I
American military personnel of World War II
Chief Justices of the Arizona Supreme Court
Justices of the Arizona Supreme Court
Republican Party members of the Arizona House of Representatives
People of pre-statehood Arizona
People from Apache County, Arizona
Udall family
University of Arizona alumni